The axolotl (from  ) (Ambystoma mexicanum) is a paedomorphic salamander closely related to the tiger salamander. It is unusual among amphibians in that it reaches adulthood without undergoing metamorphosis. Instead of taking to the land, adults remain aquatic and gilled. The species was originally found in several lakes underlying what is now Mexico City, such as Lake Xochimilco and Lake Chalco. These lakes were drained by Spanish settlers after the conquest of the Aztec Empire, leading to the destruction of much of the axolotl’s natural habitat.

Axolotls should not be confused with the larval stage of the closely related tiger salamander (A. tigrinum), which are widespread in much of North America and occasionally become paedomorphic. Neither should they be confused with mudpuppies (Necturus spp.), fully aquatic salamanders from a different family that are not closely related to the axolotl but bear a superficial resemblance.

, the axolotl was near extinction due to urbanization in Mexico City and consequent water pollution, as well as the introduction of invasive species such as tilapia and perch. It is listed as critically endangered in the wild, with a decreasing population of around 50 to 1,000 adult individuals, by the International Union for Conservation of Nature and Natural Resources (IUCN) and is listed under Appendix II of the Convention on International Trade in Endangered Species (CITES). Axolotls are used extensively in scientific research due to their ability to regenerate limbs, gills and parts of their eyes and brains. Axolotls were also sold as food in Mexican markets and were a staple in the Aztec diet.

Description

Axolotls possess features typical of salamander larvae, including external gills and a caudal fin extending from behind the head to the vent. External gills are usually lost when salamander species mature into adulthood, although the axolotl maintains this feature. This is due to their neoteny evolution, where axolotls are much more aquatic than other salamander species.

Their heads are wide, and their eyes are lidless. Their limbs are underdeveloped and possess long, thin digits. Males are identified by their swollen cloacae lined with papillae, while females are noticeable for their wider bodies full of eggs. Three pairs of external gill stalks (rami) originate behind their heads and are used to move oxygenated water. The external gill rami are lined with filaments (fimbriae) to increase surface area for gas exchange. Four-gill slits lined with gill rakers are hidden underneath the external gills, which prevent food from entering and allow particles to filter through.

Axolotls have barely visible vestigial teeth, which develop during metamorphosis. The primary method of feeding is by suction, during which their rakers interlock to close the gill slits. External gills are used for respiration, although buccal pumping (gulping air from the surface) may also be used to provide oxygen to their lungs. Buccal pumping can occur in a two-stroke manner that pumps air from the mouth to the lungs, and with four-stroke that reverses this pathway with compression forces.

Axolotls have four pigmentation genes; when mutated they create different color variants. The normal wild-type animal is brown/tan with gold speckles and an olive undertone. The five more common mutant colors are leucistic (pale pink with black eyes), golden albino (golden with gold eyes), xanthic (grey with black eyes), albino (pale pink/white with red eyes) which is more common in axolotls than some other creatures, and melanoid (all black/dark blue with no gold speckling or olive tone). In addition, there is wide individual variability in the size, frequency, and intensity of the gold speckling and at least one variant that develops a black and white piebald appearance on reaching maturity. Because pet breeders frequently cross the variant colors, double homozygous mutants are common in the pet trade, especially white/pink animals with pink eyes that are double homozygous mutants for both the albino and leucistic trait. Axolotls also have some limited ability to alter their color to provide better camouflage by changing the relative size and thickness of their melanophores.

Habitat and ecology

The axolotl is native only to the freshwater of Lake Xochimilco and Lake Chalco in the Valley of Mexico. Lake Chalco no longer exists, having been drained as a flood control measure, and Lake Xochimilco remains a remnant of its former self, existing mainly as canals.

Surveys in 1998, 2003, and 2008 found 6,000, 1,000, and 100 axolotls per square kilometer in its Lake Xochimilco habitat, respectively. A four-month-long search in 2013, however, turned up no surviving individuals in the wild. Just a month later, two wild ones were spotted in a network of canals leading from Xochimilco.

The wild population has been put under heavy pressure by the growth of Mexico City. The axolotl is currently on the International Union for Conservation of Nature's annual Red List of threatened species. Non-native fish, such as African tilapia and Asian carp, have also recently been introduced to the waters. These new fish have been eating the axolotls' young, as well as their primary source of food.

Axolotls are members of the tiger salamander, or Ambystoma tigrinum, species complex, along with all other Mexican species of Ambystoma. Their habitat is like that of most neotenic species—a high-altitude body of water surrounded by a risky terrestrial environment. These conditions are thought to favor neoteny. However, a terrestrial population of Mexican tiger salamanders occupies and breeds in the axolotl's habitat.

Diet 
The axolotl is carnivorous, consuming small prey such as mollusks, worms, insects, other arthropods, and small fish in the wild. Axolotls locate food by smell, and will "snap" at any potential meal, sucking the food into their stomachs with vacuum force.

Use as a model organism

Today, the axolotl is still used in research as a model organism, and large numbers are bred in captivity. They are especially easy to breed compared to other salamanders in their family, which are rarely captive-bred due to the demands of terrestrial life. One attractive feature for research is the large and easily manipulated embryo, which allows viewing of the full development of a vertebrate. Axolotls are used in heart defect studies due to the presence of a mutant gene that causes heart failure in embryos. Since the embryos survive almost to hatching with no heart function, the defect is very observable. The axolotl is also considered an ideal animal model for the study of neural tube closure due to the similarities between human and axolotl neural plate and tube formation; the axolotl's neural tube, unlike the frog's, is not hidden under a layer of superficial epithelium. There are also mutations affecting other organ systems some of which are not well characterized and others that are. The genetics of the color variants of the axolotl have also been widely studied.

Regeneration 
The feature of the axolotl that attracts most attention is its healing ability: the axolotl does not heal by scarring and is capable of the regeneration of entire lost appendages in a period of months, and, in certain cases, more vital structures, such as tail, limb, central nervous system, and tissues of the eye and heart. They can even restore less vital parts of their brains. They can also readily accept transplants from other individuals, including eyes and parts of the brain—restoring these alien organs to full functionality. In some cases, axolotls have been known to repair a damaged limb, as well as regenerating an additional one, ending up with an extra appendage that makes them attractive to pet owners as a novelty. In metamorphosed individuals, however, the ability to regenerate is greatly diminished. The axolotl is therefore used as a model for the development of limbs in vertebrates. There are three basic requirements for regeneration of the limb: the wound epithelium, nerve signaling, and the presence of cells from the different limb axes. A wound epidermis is quickly formed by the cells to cover up the site of the wound. In the following days, the cells of the wound epidermis divide and grow quickly forming a blastema, which means the wound is ready to heal and undergo patterning to form the new limb.

It is believed that during limb generation, axolotls have a different system to regulate their internal macrophage level and suppress inflammation, as scarring prevents proper healing and regeneration. However, this belief has been questioned by other studies. The axolotl’s regenerative properties leave the species as the perfect model to study the process of stem cells and its own neoteny feature. Current research can record specific examples of these regenerative properties through tracking cell fates and behaviors, lineage tracing skin triploid cell grafts, pigmentation imaging, electroporation, tissue clearing and lineage tracing from dye labeling. The newer technologies of germline modification and transgenesis are better suited for live imaging the regenerative processes that occur for axolotls.

Genome 
The 32 billion base pair long sequence of the axolotl's genome was published in 2018 and was the largest animal genome completed at the time. It revealed species-specific genetic pathways that may be responsible for limb regeneration. Although the axolotl genome is about 10 times as large as the human genome, it encodes a similar number of proteins, namely 23,251 (the human genome encodes about 20,000 proteins). The size difference is mostly explained by a large fraction of repetitive sequences, but such repeated elements also contribute to increased median intron sizes (22,759 bp) which are 13, 16 and 25 times that observed in human (1,750 bp), mouse (1,469 bp) and Tibetan frog (906 bp), respectively.

Neoteny 

When most amphibians are young, they live in water, and they use gills that can breathe in the water. When they become adults, they go through a process called metamorphosis, in which they lose their gills and start living on land. However, the axolotl is unusual in that it has a lack of thyroid stimulating hormone, which is needed for the thyroid to produce thyroxine in order for the axolotl to go through metamorphosis; therefore, it keeps its gills and lives in water all its life, even after it becomes an adult and is able to reproduce. Its body has the capacity to go through metamorphosis if given the necessary hormone, but axolotls do not produce it, and must be exposed to it from an external source, after which an axolotl undergoes an artificially-induced metamorphosis and begins living on land. One method of artificial metamorphosis induction is through an injection of iodine, which is used in the production of thyroid hormones.

An axolotl undergoing metamorphosis experiences a number of physiological changes that help them adapt to life on land. These include increased muscle tone in limbs, the absorption of gills and fins into the body, the development of eyelids, and a reduction in the skin's permeability to water, allowing the axolotl to stay more easily hydrated when on land. The lungs of an axolotl, though present alongside gills after reaching non-metamorphosed adulthood, develop further during metamorphosis.

An axolotl that has gone through metamorphosis resembles an adult plateau tiger salamander, though the axolotl differs in its longer toes. The process of artificially inducing metamorphosis can often result in death during or even following a successful attempt, and so casual hobbyists are generally discouraged from attempting to induce metamorphosis in pet axolotls.

Neoteny is the term for reaching sexual maturity without undergoing metamorphosis. Many other species within the axolotl's genus are also either entirely neotenic or have neotenic populations. Sirens and Necturus are other neotenic salamanders, although unlike axolotls, they cannot be induced to metamorphose by an injection of iodine or thyroxine hormone.

The genes responsible for neoteny in laboratory animals may have been identified; however, they are not linked in wild populations, suggesting artificial selection is the cause of complete neoteny in laboratory and pet axolotls.

Six adult axolotls (including a leucistic specimen) were shipped from Mexico City to the Jardin des Plantes in Paris in 1863. Unaware of their neoteny, Auguste Duméril was surprised when, instead of the axolotl, he found in the vivarium a new species, similar to the salamander. This discovery was the starting point of research about neoteny. It is not certain that Ambystoma velasci specimens were not included in the original shipment. Vilem Laufberger in Prague used thyroid hormone injections to induce an axolotl to grow into a terrestrial adult salamander. The experiment was repeated by Englishman Julian Huxley, who was unaware the experiment had already been done, using ground thyroids. Since then, experiments have been done often with injections of iodine or various thyroid hormones used to induce metamorphosis.

Neoteny has been observed in all salamander families in which it seems to be a survival mechanism, in aquatic environments only of mountain and hill, with little food and, in particular, with little iodine. In this way, salamanders can reproduce and survive in the form of a smaller larval stage, which is aquatic and requires a lower quality and quantity of food compared to the big adult, which is terrestrial. If the salamander larvae ingest a sufficient amount of iodine, directly or indirectly through cannibalism, they quickly begin metamorphosis and transform into bigger terrestrial adults, with higher dietary requirements. In fact, in some high mountain lakes there live dwarf forms of salmonids that are caused by deficiencies in food and, in particular, iodine, which causes cretinism and dwarfism due to hypothyroidism, as it does in humans.

Threats 
Axolotls are only native to the Mexican Central Valley. Although the native axolotl population once extended through most of the lakes and wetlands that make up this region, the Native habitat is now limited to Lake Xochimilco as a result of the expansion of Mexico City. Lake Xochimilco is not a large body of water, but rather a small series of artificial channels, small lakes, and temporary wetlands.

Lake Xochimilco has poor water quality, caused by the region’s aquaculture and agriculture demands. It is also maintained by inputs of only partially treated wastewater. Water quality tests reveal a low nitrogen: phosphorus ratio and a high concentration of chlorophyll a, which are indicative of an oxygen-poor environment that is not well-suited for axolotls.  In addition, the intensive use of pesticides from agriculture around Lake Xochimilco causes run off into the lake and a reduction of habitat quality for axolotls. The pesticides used contain chemical compounds that studies show to sharply increase mortality in axolotl embryos and larvae. Of the surviving embryo and larvae, there is also an increase of morphological, behavior, and activity abnormalities.  

Another factor that threatens the native axolotl population is the introduction of invasive species such as the Nile tilapia and common carp. These invasive fish species threaten axolotl populations by eating their eggs or young and by out-competing them for natural resources. The presence of these species has also been shown to change the behavior of axolotls, causing them to be less active to avoid predation. This reduction in activity greatly impacts the axolotls foraging and mating opportunities. 

With such a small native population, there is a large loss of genetic diversity. This lack of genetic diversity can be dangerous for the remaining population, causing an increase in inbreeding and a decrease in general fitness and adaptive potential. It ultimately raises the axolotl’s risk for extinction, something that they are already in danger of. Studies have found indicators of a low interpopulation gene flow and higher rates of genetic drift. These are likely the result of multiple “bottleneck” incidents in which events that kill off several individuals of a population occur and sharply reduce the genetic diversity of the remaining population. The offspring produced after bottleneck events have a greater risk of showing decreased fitness and are often less capable of adaptation down the line. Multiple bottleneck events can have disastrous effects on a population. Studies have also found high rates of relatedness that are indicative of inbreeding. Inbreeding can be especially harmful as it can cause an increase in the presence of deleterious, or harmful, genes within a population. 

There has been little improvement in the conditions of the lake or the population of native axolotls. Many scientists are focusing their conservation efforts on translocation of captive-bred individuals into new habitats or reintroduction into Lake Xochimilco. The Laboratorio de Restauracion Ecologica (LRE) in the Universidad Nacional Autonoma de Mexico (UNAM) has built up a population of more than 100 captive-bred individuals. These axolotls are mostly used for research by the lab but plans of a semi-artificial wetland inside the university have been established and the goal is to establish a viable population of axolotls within it. Studies have shown that captive-bred axolotls that are raised in a semi-natural environment can catch prey, survive in the wild, and have moderate success in escaping predators. These captive-bred individuals can be introduced into unpolluted bodies of water or back into Lake Xochimilco to establish or re-establish a wild population.

In culture 
The species is named after the Aztec deity Xolotl, who  who transformed himself into an axolotl to avoid being sacrificed by fellow gods. They continue to play an outsized cultural role in Mexico.

They appear in the works of Mexican muralist Diego Rivera. In 2021 Mexico released an new design for its 50-peso banknote featuring an axolotl along with maize and chinampas on its back. It was recognized as "Bank Note of the Year" by the International Bank Note Society.

The Pokémon Mudkip (ミズゴロウ Mizugorou), added in Generation III (2002) is often said to be based on Axolotls.

The looks of Toothless and The Light Fury in the How to Train Your Dragon movies are based on Axolotls.

In 2020, Axolotls were added to the video game Minecraft (1.17). It is following Mojang Studios' trend of adding endangered species to the game to raise awareness. They were also added to Minecraft: Dungeons (1.14.1.0) in 2022 and is available in Lego Minecraft (21180).

Captive care

The axolotl is a popular exotic pet like its relative, the tiger salamander (Ambystoma tigrinum). As for all poikilothermic organisms, lower temperatures result in slower metabolism and a very unhealthily reduced appetite. Chlorine, commonly added to tapwater, is harmful to axolotls. A single axolotl typically requires a  tank. Axolotls spend the majority of the time at the bottom of the tank.

Salts, such as Holtfreter's solution, are often added to the water to prevent infection.

In captivity, axolotls eat a variety of readily available foods, including trout and salmon pellets, frozen or live bloodworms, earthworms, and waxworms. Axolotls can also eat feeder fish, but care should be taken as fish may contain parasites.

Substrates are another important consideration for captive axolotls, as axolotls (like other amphibians and reptiles) tend to ingest bedding material together with food and are commonly prone to gastrointestinal obstruction and foreign body ingestion. Some common substrates used for animal enclosures can be harmful for amphibians and reptiles. Gravel (common in aquarium use) should not be used, and is recommended that any sand consists of smooth particles with a grain size of under 1mm. One guide to axolotl care for laboratories notes that bowel obstructions are a common cause of death, and recommends that no items with a diameter below 3 cm (or approximately the size of the animal's head) should be available to the animal.

There is some evidence that axolotls might seek out appropriately-sized gravel for use as gastroliths based on experiments conducted at the University of Manitoba axolotl colony, but these studies are outdated and not conclusive. As there is no conclusive evidence pointing to gastrolith use, gravel should be avoided due to the high risk of impaction.

See also
 Mudpuppies
 Olm
 Texas salamander
 Texas blind salamander
 Lake Patzcuaro salamander
 Barred tiger salamander
 Amphibious fish
 Handfish
 Regenerative biomedicine

References

External links

 
 Follow the Eggs, Hatchlings and Juveniles
 Mating Dance and Laying Eggs
 Follow the Eggs and Hatchlings (2nd Batch)
 Indiana U Axolotl Colony
 University of KY Axolotl Colony
 Mystical amphibian venerated by Aztecs nears extinction
 The animal that’s everywhere and nowhere
 
 "The Tao of Axolotl" – thetolteciching.com; on folklore

Amphibians described in the 18th century
Animal models
Animal testing on amphibians
Animals bred for albinism on a large scale
Critically endangered biota of Mexico
Critically endangered fauna of North America
Endemic amphibians of Mexico
Mole salamanders
Population genetics
Regenerative biomedicine
Taxa named by Frederick Polydore Nodder
Taxa named by George Shaw
Valley of Mexico